Robert John Edwards  (26 October 1925 – 28 May 2012) was a British journalist.

Edwards was editor of Tribune (1951–54), a feature writer on the Evening Standard (1954–57), deputy editor of the Sunday Express (1957–59), managing editor of the Daily Express (1959–1961) then its editor (1961), editor of the Glasgow Evening Citizen (1962–63), editor of the Daily Express again (1963–65), editor of the Sunday People (1966–1972) and editor of the Sunday Mirror (1972–1984). He was a director of Mirror Group Newspapers from 1976 to 1988.

He published an autobiography in 1988, Goodbye Fleet Street. He was interviewed by National Life Stories (C467/10) in 2007 for the 'Oral History of the British Press' collection held by the British Library.

Edwards was appointed a CBE in the 1986 Birthday Honours. He died on 28 May 2012, at the age of 86.

References

1925 births
2012 deaths
British male journalists
British magazine editors
British newspaper editors
Commanders of the Order of the British Empire
Daily Express people
The Sunday People people
People educated at Ranelagh Grammar School